Cold War is a 2018 historical drama film directed by Paweł Pawlikowski, who co-wrote the screenplay with Janusz Głowacki and Piotr Borkowski. It is an international co-production by producers in Poland, France and the United Kingdom. Set in Poland and France during the Cold War from the late 1940s until the 1960s, the story follows a musical director (Tomasz Kot) who discovers a young singer (Joanna Kulig), exploring their subsequent love story over the years. The film, which was loosely inspired by the lives of Pawlikowski's parents, also features Borys Szyc, Agata Kulesza, Cédric Kahn and Jeanne Balibar in supporting roles.

Cold War premiered at the 2018 Cannes Film Festival on 10 May 2018. Critics praised its acting, screenplay, direction and cinematography. The film has received numerous accolades, including three nominations at the 91st Academy Awards (Best Foreign Language Film, Best Director and Best Cinematography) and four at the 72nd BAFTA Film Awards, as well as six awards from seven nominations at the 31st European Film Awards, winning the main Best Film Award.

Plot
In post-World War II Poland, Wiktor and Irena are holding auditions for a state-sponsored folk music ensemble. Wiktor's attention is immediately captured by Zula, an ambitious and captivating young woman who is faking a peasant identity and is on probation after attacking her abusive father. Wiktor and Zula quickly develop a strong, obsessive attraction and have sex after a performance. Wiktor and Irena are pressured by bureaucrats to include pro-Communist and pro-Stalinist propaganda in their performances—in exchange, the troupe would be allowed to tour the Eastern Bloc. Wiktor and Irena are opposed to this, but the career-driven, opportunistic Kaczmarek agrees, and a resentful Irena quits. Kaczmarek is also interested in Zula and pressures her into spying on Wiktor for him, but Zula does not reveal any incriminating information. The ensemble visits East Berlin, Wiktor plans to flee to the west with Zula, and the two affirm their love and passion. Zula fails to come to the rendezvous with Wiktor and he crosses the border alone.

Years later, Zula meets Wiktor in Paris, where he is working at a jazz club. They both have other partners but their continued mutual attraction is clear. When Wiktor asks Zula why she failed to appear with him to cross the border, she says that she lacked confidence in herself. A year later, Wiktor attends one of the troupe's performances in Yugoslavia, where Zula spots him in the audience and becomes visibly shaken. Two years later, Wiktor is working as a film score composer in Paris, where Zula reunites with him. She has married another man to obtain a visa so that she could travel to Paris and be with Wiktor. Wiktor attempts to build a singing career for Zula. He embellishes her backstory to make her more interesting to film producer Michel, which annoys Zula. Zula becomes jealous of Wiktor's past lovers, and as work on her record strains their relationship, she begins to drink heavily and misbehave in public. Wiktor and Zula finish Zula's record, but a disappointed Zula remains frustrated and unhappy. She reveals that she had an affair with Michel and insults Wiktor, and he strikes her. She later disappears, and Wiktor confronts Michel, who reveals she has returned to Poland.

Against the advice of a Polish embassy official in Paris, Wiktor returns to Poland. Zula meets with him at a work camp, where he reveals that he has been sentenced to a "generous" 15 years of hard labor on charges of defecting and espionage; his hand is visibly disfigured. Zula promises to free him. Five years later, a freed Wiktor meets with Kaczmarek at a club where Zula, now a barely-functioning alcoholic, is performing. Zula arranged for an early release for Wiktor by agreeing to marry Kaczmarek, and now has a young son with him. Wiktor and Zula escape to a bathroom together, where a miserable and defeated Zula begs Wiktor to rescue her. The two take a bus to an abandoned church seen at the beginning of the film, where they exchange marriage vows and prepare to commit suicide together. After ingesting pills, the couple is seen sitting outside, observing the landscape. Zula suggests they view it "from the other side," and the two stand and depart from view, as wheat fields sway in the wind.

Cast

Reception

Box office
Cold War grossed $4.6 million in the United States and Canada, and $15.9 million in other territories, for a worldwide total of $20.5 million.

In the film's opening weekend in the United States it made $54,353 from three theaters, an average of 	$18,118 per venue. In its sixth weekend of release, following its three Oscar nominations, the film made $571,650 from 111 theaters.

Critical response
The website's critical consensus reads, "With a brilliantly stark visual aesthetic to match its lean narrative, Cold War doesn't waste a moment of its brief running time — and doesn't skimp on its bittersweet emotional impact." Metacritic gives the film a weighted average score of 90 out of 100, based on 45 critics, indicating "universal acclaim".

Giuseppe Sedia of the Krakow Post wrote, "...less hieratic than Ida, Cold War has a lot to offer to the audience. Maybe Pawlikowski would have not won Best Director Award at Cannes if it wasn't for the sumptuous acting displayed in this cruel, jazz-drenched and Mizoguchi-esque tale of two lovers". Writing in The Guardian, Peter Bradshaw wrote that this is a "musically glorious and visually ravishing film" that "is about the dark heart of Poland itself".

Accolades

See also
 List of submissions to the 91st Academy Awards for Best Foreign Language Film
 List of Polish submissions for the Academy Award for Best Foreign Language Film

Notes

References

External links
 
 
 
 
 
Cold War: You’re My Only Home an essay by Stephanie Zacharek at the Criterion Collection

2018 films
2018 drama films
Amazon Studios films
British black-and-white films
British drama films
European Film Awards winners (films)
Films about communism
Films critical of communism
Films directed by Paweł Pawlikowski
2018 independent films
Films about music and musicians
Films set in Berlin
Films set in Paris
Films set in the 1940s
Films set in the 1950s
Films set in the 1960s
Films set in Yugoslavia
French black-and-white films
2010s French-language films
French drama films
Polish black-and-white films
Polish drama films
2010s Polish-language films
2018 multilingual films
British multilingual films
French multilingual films
Polish multilingual films
2010s British films
2010s French films